Marian Borzemski (21 July 1894 – 12 November 1959) was a Polish sports shooter. He competed in three events at the 1924 Summer Olympics.

References

External links
 

1894 births
1959 deaths
Sportspeople from Ivano-Frankivsk
People from the Kingdom of Galicia and Lodomeria
Polish male sport shooters
Olympic shooters of Poland
Shooters at the 1924 Summer Olympics